The name IDream may refer to:

iDream is a registered trademark of iDream Multimedia Ltd based in Hong Kong. The company produces multimedia products most notably MP3 and MP4 based devices. Its products are sold in the Benelux countries, France and south of Europe.
I Dream, was a half-an-hour-long British children's television comedy aimed at and mostly about teenagers, which aired in 2004.